Utkuhiksalik, Utkuhikhalik, Utkuhikhaliq, Utkuhiksalingmiutitut, Utkuhiksalingmiutut, Utkuhiksalingmiut Inuktitut, Utku, Gjoa Haven dialect, is a sub-dialect of Natsilingmiutut (Nattiliŋmiut) dialect of Inuvialuktun (Western Canadian Inuit or Inuktitut) language once spoken in the Utkuhiksalik (ᐅᑦᑯᓯᒃᓴᓕᒃ Chantrey Inlet) area of Nunavut, and now spoken mainly by elders in Uqsuqtuuq (or Uqšuqtuuq ᐅᖅᓱᖅᑑᖅ Gjoa Haven) and Qamani'tuaq (ᖃᒪᓂ‛ᑐᐊᖅ Baker Lake) on mainland Canada. It is generally written in Inuktitut syllabics.

The traditional territory of the Utkuhiksalingmiut / Utkuhikhalingmiut / Ukkusiksalingmiut / Utkusiksalinmiut / Ukkuhikhalinmiut  (meaning "the people of the place where there is soapstone" or "people who have cooking pots") people lay between Chantrey Inlet and Franklin Lake. They made their pots (utkuhik ~ utkusik) from soapstone of the area, therefore their name.

Utkuhiksalik has been analysed as a subdialect of Natsilik within the Western Canadian Inuktun (Inuvialuktun) dialect continuum. While Utkuhiksalik has much in common with the other Natsilik subdialects, the Utkuhiksalingmiut and the Natsilingmiut were historically distinct groups. Today there are still lexical and phonological differences between Utkuhiksalik and Natsilik.

Comparison 
Utkuhiksalik closely related to Natsilik. The comparison of some words in the two sub-dialects:

Utkuhiksalik ařgaq 'hand'    (Natsilik proper ažgak)
Utkuhiksalik aqiřgiq 'ptarmigan'   (Natsilik proper aqigžeq)
Utkuhiksalik ipřit 'you' (Natsilik proper ižvit)

Franz Boas

Franz Boas included the Ukusiksalirmiut as a tribe of the "Central Eskimo" in the 1888 Sixth Annual Report of the Bureau of Ethnology to the Smithsonian Institution,

He considered the Ukusiksalik (Wager River) to be one of "five principal settlements" which included the "Aivillirmiut are Pikiulaq (Depot Island), Nuvung and Ukusiksalik (Wager River), Aivillik (Repulse Bay), Akugdlit (Committee Bay), and Maluksilaq (Lyon Inlet). They may be divided into two groups, the former comprising the southern settlements, the latter the northern ones. Every one of these settlements has certain well known sites, which are frequented at the proper seasons." Their team was not able to make the sledge journeys by ice from Nuvung to Ukusiksalik in the winter of 1864-1865 because large water holes were formed at "the entrance of the bay." In his appendix Boas included Ukusiksalik, "the place with pot stone" and Ukusiksalirmiut, "inhabitant of Ukusiksalik."

Knud Rasmussen

The Danish explorer, Knud Rasmussen during his Fifth Thule Expedition, when he crossed the Canadian Arctic, often by dogsled, visited the Jessie Oonark's camp when she was just a teenager. For the remote Utkuhikhalingmiut, he represented the first white contact. In the 1980s, Mame Jackson taped Jessie Oonark speaking in Utkuhiksalik and describing this encounter. The interview was broadcast on CBC radio.

Inuit artists
Well-known first generation Inuit artists, such as Jessie Oonark,  OC RCA ( ᔨᐊᓯ ᐅᓈᖅ; 2 March 1906 -  7 March 1985), Luke Anguhadluk and Marion Tuu'luuq were known as fluent speakers of Utkuhiksalik. Their art work like that of the next generation, which includes many of Oonark's children, reflects many aspects of the Utkuhikhalingmiut culture.

Dictionary
A complete dictionary of Utkuhiksalik was first published in 2015, marking an important contribution to the preservation of the sub-dialect. Jean Briggs, an anthropologist and expert on Inuit languages, helped to compile the dictionary.

See also 
Ukkusiksalik National Park

References

External links 
Utkuhiksalingmiut Inuktitut Dictionary Project ᑐᑭᕐᑲᖅᑐᑦ ᐅᑦᑯᓯᒃᓴᓕᖕᒥᐅᑦ ᐅᕐᑲᐅᓯᖕᒋᑦ

Inuit group
Agglutinative languages
Indigenous languages of the North American Arctic
First Nations languages in Canada
Inuit languages
Caribou Inuit
Inuktitut words and phrases